Season in Cairo is a 1933 German musical comedy film directed by Reinhold Schünzel and starring Renate Müller, Willy Fritsch and Gustav Waldau. A French-language version Idylle au Caire was released, also featuring Müller. The film's sets were designed by the art directors Robert Herlth and Walter Röhrig. It was shot on location in Egypt at Giza and Cairo, with interior filming taking place at the Babelsberg Studios in Berlin.

Cast

References

Bibliography

External links

1933 films
1933 musical comedy films
German musical comedy films
Films of the Weimar Republic
1930s German-language films
Films directed by Reinhold Schünzel
Films set in Egypt
German multilingual films
UFA GmbH films
Films shot at Babelsberg Studios
German black-and-white films
1933 multilingual films
1930s German films